Luchu may refer to:

 Luchu Islands, a synonym of the Ryukyu Islands, an island chain under the administration of the Japanese government
 Luchu language, indigenous languages of the Ryukyu Islands
 Luchu Pine (Pinus luchuensis), a species of conifer in the family Pinaceae
 Luchu, an English name for the Ryukyu Kingdom

See also
 Luzhu District, Taoyuan, northwestern Taiwan